Peyton Olivia Knight is an American fashion model.

Early life
At age 11, Knight was discovered by Elite Model Management while leaving a movie theater with her mother; two years later she was signed to IMG Models.

Career
While in high school, she worked in Tokyo for six weeks; after graduating early, she walked for Chanel in Rome and did a Gucci campaign. Her first job was an editorial for W photographed by Steven Meisel. Knight debuted as an Alexander Wang exclusive and like many models in that show she received a distinctive haircut from hairstylist Guido Palau.

In response to controversial comments by Kendall Jenner, Knight was one of many fashion models who spoke about how difficult fashion week is to maintain 30 or more shows while possibly not getting paid or being able to have meals.

Knight was chosen as a “Top Newcomer” by models.com, in 2015.

References 

Living people
1998 births
American female models
People from St. Louis
21st-century American women